Bernhard Johansen (25 June 1929 – 31 January 2006) was a Norwegian footballer. He played in one match for the Norway national football team in 1953.

References

External links
 

1929 births
2006 deaths
Norwegian footballers
Norway international footballers
Place of birth missing
Association footballers not categorized by position